The Dirksen Senate Office Building is the second office building constructed for members of the United States Senate in Washington, D.C., and was named for the late Minority Leader Everett Dirksen from Illinois in 1972.

History

On the eve of America's entry into World War II, in 1941, the U.S. Senate authorized the Architect of the Capitol to prepare plans for a second Senate Office Building.  The federal government's expanded role nationally and internationally beginning in the 1930s raised new issues for senatorial action, which in turn required increased staff assistance and created crowded conditions in the Capitol and the original Senate Office Building.  When World War II delayed implementation of the Senate's building plans, the space problems grew increasingly urgent.  Soon after the war, the United States Congress passed the Legislative Reorganization Act of 1946, in order to modernize and streamline its operations and provide senators and committees with professional staff assistance.  To house the additional staff, the Senate resorted to renting space in nearby buildings.  Moreover, with the anticipated admission of Alaska and Hawaii as states, four new senators would also require office space.  As pressure for more space mounted, the Senate in 1948 acquired property on which to erect a second office building in order to accommodate the enlarged staff.

The consulting architects, Otto R. Eggers and Daniel Paul Higgins firm Eggers & Higgins of New York City, drew the plans for a seven-story building faced in white marble, to be located across First Street from the Old Senate Office Building (Russell Senate Office Building) and diagonally across the Capitol grounds from the Senate wing of the Capitol.  Although more streamlined and less ornate, the new building was designed to harmonize with the Capitol and the first Senate Office Building.  Bronze spandrels between the third- and fourth-floor windows depicted scenes from American industry: Shipping, Farming, Manufacturing, Mining and Lumbering.  Below the new building's west pediment is the inscription: “The Senate is the Living Symbol of Our Union of States.”

Although the Senate approved the plans for the new building in 1949, construction was delayed until 1956.  By then, increased costs of construction caused some scaling back of the original design, including the elimination of a planned central corridor.  With Architect of the Capitol J. George Stewart looking on, members of the Senate Office Building Commission laid the cornerstone on July 13, 1956, and the new office building opened on October 15, 1958.

The Dirksen Building was designed to accommodate the television era, complete with committee hearing rooms equipped with rostrums that were better suited to listening to testimony than sitting around conference tables, as had been done in previous committee rooms, both in the U.S. Capitol and the Russell Senate Office Building.  In the 1970s, a third Senate office building, the Hart Senate Office Building was built next to the Dirksen Building on a spot originally intended for a mirror image of the Dirksen Senate Office Building.  The Hart and Dirksen Buildings are connected, and one can walk between the two almost as easily as if they were one structure.

Renovation
The building was renovated during 1999–2000 under the auspices of the Architect of the Capitol, who at the time was Alan M. Hantman, FAIA.  Day-to-day supervision of the project carried out by Assistant Architect Michael G. Turnbull, FAIA.  The renovation was well received by senators and their staff.  Senator Robert F. Bennett of Utah, Chairman of the Senate Legislative Branch Subcommittee, made the following comments regarding the renovation:

"When I came here, the Dirksen Building was considered the low-rent district, and Senators would start their careers in the Dirksen Building and then move out as quickly as they possibly could. I have nostalgia for the Dirksen Building because this is where my father had his office, and I was very content to stay here... Now that it has been renovated--and mine was the first suite to be renovated--I consider that we are in the high-rent district... thank you for the truly well thought out way in which this building is being renovated. It is now work space that will serve the needs of the Senators for another fifty years. It is roughly fifty years since the Dirksen Building was conceived, and I am sure that we will get our money's worth out of it."

List of current U.S. senators in the Dirksen Senate Office Building

Committees inside Dirksen Senate Office Building
United States Senate Committee on Banking, Housing and Urban Affairs
United States Senate Committee on the Budget
United States Senate Committee on Commerce, Science and Transportation
United States Senate Committee on Energy and Natural Resources
United States Senate Committee on Environment and Public Works
United States Senate Committee on Finance
United States Senate Committee on Foreign Relations
United States Senate Committee on Health, Education, Labor and Pensions
United States Senate Committee on Homeland Security and Governmental Affairs
United States Senate Committee on the Judiciary

See also
2003 ricin letters

References

External links

 https://www.senate.gov/
 C-SPAN American History TV tour of the Dirksen Senate Office Building with Senate Historian Emeritus Don Ritchie

Congressional office buildings
Eggers & Higgins buildings
Government buildings completed in 1958